St. George is a small village located in and part of the municipality of County of Brant, between Cambridge and Brantford, in Southern Ontario, Canada. It had a population of 3,354 according to the 2021 Census.

The Apples Harvest Festival takes place during the third weekend in September and the town holds a Kinsmen Club of Brantford service club.

St. George is known for its numerous antique stores on Main St.

The municipal offices of the former Township of South Dumfries, an old Victorian mansion known as Sunnyside, have been the home of current County of Brant mayor David Bailey, since 2000

References

External links
 St. George Applefest
 County of Brant
 St. George Street Map (PDF)

Communities in the County of Brant
Former towns in Ontario